Jake Ball may refer to:

 Jake Ball (cricketer) (born 1991), English cricketer
 Jake Ball (rugby union) (born 1991), Welsh rugby union player